Aisha Abdurrahman Bewley (born 1948) is a convert to Islam and author or translator of many books on Islam. The WorldCat union catalog lists her as author or translator for  "73 works in 172 publications in 3 languages and 855 library holdings". She and her husband collaborated on an English translation of the Qur'an.

Life
According to her website, she was born in 1948 in the United States, received a BA in French and an MA in Near Eastern Languages from the University of California, Berkeley and attended the American University in Cairo on a fellowship. She converted to Islam in 1968. She is married to Hajj Abdalhaqq Bewley, who is often co-translator of her books, and is the father of her three children.

Selected works

Translations
 (tr.) The Darqawi Way: Letters of Mawlay al-Darqawi by Muhammad al-Arabi al-Darqawi. Norwich: Diwan Press, 1981.
 (tr.) Al-Muwatta of Imam Malik ibn Anas: The First Formulation of Islamic Law by Malik ibn Anas. London & New York: Kegan Paul International, 1989.
(tr. with Abdalhaqq Bewley) The noble Qurʼan: a new rendering of its meaning in English. Norwich: Diwan Press, 1999.
 The Madinan Way: the soundness of the basic premises of the School of the People of Madina by Ibn Taymiyyah. 2000.
 (tr.) Ibn al-Arabi on the mysteries of bearing witness to the oneness of God and prophethood of Muhammad by Ibn Arabi. 2002.
 (tr.) Tafsir al-Qurtubi: classical commentary of the Holy Qurʼan by Al-Qurtubi. 2003.

Other works
 (with Abdalhaqq Bewley and Ahmad Thomson) The Islamic will: a practical guide to being prepared for death and writing your will according to the Shariʻa of Islam and English law. London : Dar Al Taqwa, 1995.
 A glossary of Islamic terms. 1998.
 Islam: the empowering of women. 1999.
 Muslim women: a biographical dictionary. 2004.

References

External links
 Aisha Bewley's Islamic Home Page

Converts to Islam
Muslim writers
Translators from Arabic
1948 births
Living people
UC Berkeley College of Letters and Science alumni
American Muslims

Women scholars of Islam
Scholars of Sufism
Translators of the Quran into English